The MGWR Class D were  steam locomotives built in batches from 1873 to 1887 for the Midland Great Western Railway (MGWR) of Ireland to a Martin Atock design. Numbering 39 at their peak they were the standard MGWR passenger locomotive of their era.

Table

History
The D class were originally built as s between 1873 and 1887. The first batch of 12 were built by Neilson and Company of Glasgow in 1873 and a further batch of 5 by Dübs and Company of Glasgow in 1876. The class took on all but the heaviest passenger duties becoming the standard passenger locomotive of their era. They were joined by a batch of six built by Beyer, Peacock and Company, Manchester in 1880–1881 and four were built by Kitson & Co. of Leeds in 1884.  MGWR's own Broadstone Works built twelve between 1883 and 1887.  Although Broadstone Works has been extended 1877 the reason that ten were subcontracted externally was due to Broadstone working to capacity at the time.

The first batches from Neilsons and Dübs were withdrawn 1893–1898 and replaced by the more powerful MGWR Class K , which cascaded the remaining Class D's to secondary duties.

The batch of six Beyer-Peacock locomotives were selected for a rebuild to a  bogie design in 1900/01, the first use of such a configuration on the MGWR.  The rebuilt locomotives were found wanting for their intended use on the Sligo line west of Mullingar but nevertheless paved the way for the MGWR Class A and Class C 4-4-0s whilst doing useful work in the County Mayo and Achill areas.

The remaining Kitson and Broadstone built members of the class were withdrawn between 1911 and 1922, being cascaded out by more powerful  passenger locomotives being introduced.

References

Beyer, Peacock locomotives
Kitson locomotives
Neilson locomotives
2-4-0 locomotives
5 ft 3 in gauge locomotives
D
Scrapped locomotives
Steam locomotives of Ireland